2012 Emperor's Cup Final was the 92nd final of the Emperor's Cup competition. The final was played at National Stadium in Tokyo on January 1, 2013. Kashiwa Reysol won the championship.

Match details

See also
2012 Emperor's Cup

References

Emperor's Cup
2012 in Japanese football
Kashiwa Reysol matches
Gamba Osaka matches